Camdenton Memorial - Lake Regional Airport (formerly FAA LID: H21) (formerly Camdenton Memorial Airport) is a city-owned public-use airport located three nautical miles (6 km) southeast of the central business district of Camdenton, a city in Camden County, Missouri, United States. According to the FAA's National Plan of Integrated Airport Systems for 2009–2013, it is categorized as a general aviation facility.

Facilities and aircraft 
It has one runway designated 15/33 with an asphalt surface measuring 4,000 by 75 feet (1,219 x 23 m).

For the 12-month period ending August 1, 2007, the airport had 3,015 aircraft operations, an average of 251 per month: 99% general aviation and 1% military. At that time there were 28 aircraft based at this airport: 82% single-engine and 18% multi-engine.

Air show 
Every September, an air show is held at the airport.

References

External links 
 Lake Aviation Center, the fixed-base operator (FBO)
 Aerial image as of 13 April 1995 from USGS The National Map
 
 

Airports in Missouri
Buildings and structures in Camden County, Missouri